Ruff is a surname. Notable people with the surname include:

Alex Ruff (born 1974), Canadian politician
Charles Ruff (1939–2000), American lawyer
Howard Ruff, American financial adviser 
Jason Ruff (born 1970), Canadian hockey player
Leon Ruff (born 1996), American professional wrestler
Lindy Ruff (born 1960), Canadian hockey coach
Matt Ruff (born 1965), American author
Michelle Ruff (born 1967), American voice actress
Otto Ruff (1871–1939), German chemist
Thomas Ruff (born 1958), German photographer
Willie Ruff (born 1931), American hornist and bassist
Surnames from given names